Kori Bernards is the media strategist and trade and business press contact for Universal Pictures. Prior to being appointed to her position at Universal, Bernards was the Vice President of Corporate Communications for the Motion Picture Association of America (MPAA), headquartered in Los Angeles. She is the head of public relations and communications for the west coast and the principal spokeswoman in enforcing copyright protection for the MPAA. She is known to the public as a result of suing online copyright infringement hubs, including several popular BitTorrent trackers.

Career 
Before working for the MPAA, Bernards worked in politics, most recently as the communications director for the Democratic Congressional Campaign Committee, (DCCC), in the 2004 elections cycle, spending the final months of the campaign traveling with Democratic Leader Nancy Pelosi. Before that, she was press secretary to House Democratic Leader Richard A. Gephardt where she served as his spokeswoman and travelling press representative.

Before working for Gephardt, Bernards was communications director for Congressman David R. Obey of Wisconsin for four-and-a-half years, and as press secretary for the House Appropriations Committee Democrats. During that time, she volunteered, and was a board member for Horton's Kids Inc., where she worked with poor children from Anacostia, helping them obtain health care services.

In 1996, Kori Bernards worked for Secretary of Health and Human Services Donna Shalala as a political appointee to the Health Secretary's public affairs office. She was Shalala's radio press spokeswoman and travelling press coordinatrix. Bernard's first job in Washington was in the congressional office of Connecticut Representative Rosa L. DeLauro.

Personal life 
Bernards is a native Californian who grew up in Orange County. Before going to Washington, D.C., she worked in Phoenix, Arizona, on several local and state campaigns, including the Clinton-Gore Arizona campaign in 1992. She has a Bachelor of Arts in political science degree from Regis University, Denver, Colorado.

References

1953 births
Living people
Regis University alumni